The 1990 Japanese Formula 3000 Championship was contested over 10 rounds.  25 different teams, 38 different drivers, 4 different chassis and 2 different engines competed.

Calendar

All events took place at venues located within the country of Japan.

Final point standings

Driver

For every race points were awarded: 9 points to the winner, 6 for runner-up, 4 for third place, 3 for fourth place, 2 for fifth place and 1 for sixth place. No additional points were awarded. The best 7 results count.

Complete Overview

R14=retired, but classified R=retired NC=not classified NQ=did not qualify DIS=disqualified

Formula 3000
Super Formula